Alcoholic beverages appear in the Hebrew Bible, after Noah planted a vineyard and became inebriated. In the New Testament, Jesus miraculously made copious amounts of wine at the marriage at Cana (John 2). Wine is the most common alcoholic beverage mentioned in biblical literature, where it is a source of symbolism, and was an important part of daily life in biblical times. Additionally, the inhabitants of ancient Israel drank beer, and wines made from fruits other than grapes, and references to these appear in scripture.

Many Christians abstain from alcohol,  Others think biblical literature displays an ambivalence toward drinks that can be intoxicating, considering them both a blessing from God that brings joy and merriment and potentially dangerous beverages that can be sinfully abused. The relationships between Judaism and alcohol and Christianity and alcohol have generally maintained this same tension, though some modern Christian sects, particularly American Protestant groups around the time of Prohibition, have rejected alcohol as evil. The original versions of the books of the Bible use several different words for alcoholic beverages: at least 10 in Hebrew, and five in Greek. Drunkenness is discouraged and not infrequently portrayed, and some biblical persons abstained from alcohol. Wine is used symbolically, in both positive and negative terms. Its consumption is prescribed for religious rites or medicinal uses in some places.

Lexigraphy
Biblical literature uses several words in its original languages to refer to different types of alcoholic beverages. Some of these words have overlapping meaning, particularly the words in the Hebrew language compared to the words in Koine Greek, the language of both the Septuagint and the New Testament. While some deuterocanonical books may have been originally written in Hebrew or the Aramaic language, some were written in Greek. Hence, the meanings of the words used for alcoholic beverages in each of these languages has bearing on alcohol in the Bible.

Hebrew 
The Hebrew Bible was largely written in Biblical Hebrew, with portions in Biblical Aramaic, and has an important Ancient Greek translation called the Septuagint. The modern Hebrew Bible, which generally follows the Masoretic Text, uses several words to represent alcoholic beverages:

Greek 
The New Testament (Koine Greek) and Septuagint Greek words:

Alcoholic content 
Yayin and oinos (which in the Septuagint also often translates most of the Hebrew words for alcoholic beverages listed above) are commonly translated "wine", but the two are also rarely, and perhaps figuratively or anticipatorily, used to refer to freshly pressed non-alcoholic juice. For this reason, prohibitionist and some abstentionist Christians object to taking the default meaning to be fermented beverages, but others argue that the words can also refer to alcoholic beverages.

After the conquest of Palestine by Alexander the Great, the Hellenistic custom of diluting wine had taken hold such that the author of 2 Maccabees speaks of diluted wine as "a more pleasant drink" and of both undiluted wine and unmixed water as "harmful" or "distasteful."

Biblical references

The many biblical references to wine are both positive and negative, real and symbolic, descriptive and didactic. Both archaeological evidence and written records indicate the significant cultivation of grapes in ancient Israel and the popularity of wine-drinking. The production capacity apparent from archaeological remains and the frequent biblical references to wine suggest that it was the principal alcoholic beverage of the ancient Israelites.

Drunkenness 
Easton's Bible Dictionary says, "The sin of drunkenness ... must have been not uncommon in the olden times, for it is mentioned either metaphorically or literally more than seventy times in the Bible," though some suggest it was a "vice of the wealthy rather than of the poor." Biblical interpreters generally agree that the Hebrew and Christian scriptures condemn ordinary drunkenness as a serious spiritual and moral failing in passages such as these (all from the New International Version):

 f: "Do not mix with winebibbers, or gluttonous eaters of meat, for drunkards and gluttons become poor, and drowsiness clothes them in rags."
 Isaiah f: "Woe to those who rise early in the morning to run after their drinks, who stay up late at night till they are inflamed with wine.
 Galatians : "The acts of the sinful nature are obvious: ... drunkenness, orgies, and the like. I warn you, as I did before, that those who live like this will not inherit the kingdom of God."
 Ephesians : "Do not get drunk on wine, which leads to debauchery. Instead, be filled with the Spirit."

The consequences of the drunkenness of Noah and Lot "were intended to serve as examples of the dangers and repulsiveness of intemperance." The title character in the Book of Judith uses the drunkenness of the Assyrian general Holofernes to behead him in a heroic victory for the Jewish people and an embarrassing defeat for the general, who had schemed to seduce Judith.

One of the original sections of 1 Esdras describes a debate among three courtiers of Darius I of Persia over whether wine, the king, or women (but above all the truth) is the strongest. The argument for wine does not prevail in the contest, but it provides a vivid description of the ancients' view of the power wine can wield in excessive quantity.

A disputed but important passage is Proverbs . Some Christians assert that alcohol was prohibited to kings at all times, while most interpreters contend that only its abuse is in view here. Some argue that the latter instructions regarding the perishing should be understood as sarcasm when compared with the preceding verses, while others contend the beer and wine are intended as a cordial to raise the spirits of the perishing, while some suggest that the Bible is here authorizing alcohol as an anesthetic. Moreover, some suggest that the wines that Jesus was offered at his crucifixion were also intended as an anesthetic.

Sacrifices and feasts 

The Hebrew scriptures prescribed wine for use in festal celebrations and sacrificial rituals. In particular, fermented wine was presented daily as a drink offering, as part of the first Fruits offering, and as part of various supplementary offerings. Wine was kept in the Temple in Jerusalem, and the king had his own private stores. The banquet hall was called a "house of wine," and wine was used as the usual drink at most secular and religious feasts, including feasts of celebration and hospitality, tithe celebrations, Jewish holidays such as Passover, and at burials.

The first miracle of Jesus' public ministry was transforming water into fine wine at a wedding in Cana.  Jesus instituted the Eucharist at the Last Supper, which took place at a Passover celebration, and set apart the bread and "fruit of the vine" that were present there as symbols of the New Covenant. Saint Paul later chides the Corinthians for becoming drunk on wine served at their celebrations of the Lord's Supper.

Bringer of joy
The Bible also speaks of wine in general terms as a bringer and concomitant of joy, particularly in the context of nourishment and feasting, e.g.:

 Psalm 104:14–15: "[The ] makes ... plants for man to cultivate – bringing forth food from the earth: wine that gladdens the heart of man, oil to make his face shine, and bread that sustains his heart." Gregory of Nyssa (died 395) made a distinction between types of wine (intoxicating and non-intoxicating) – "not that wine which produces drunkenness, plots against the senses, and destroys the body, but such as gladdens the heart, the wine which the Prophet recommends"
 Ecclesiastes 9:7: "Go, eat your food with gladness, and drink your wine with a joyful heart, for it is now that God favors what you do."

Ben Sira discusses the use of wine in several places, emphasizing joy, prudence, and common sense.

Vows and duties 
Certain persons were forbidden in the Hebrew Bible to partake of wine because of their vows and duties. Kings were forbidden to abuse alcohol lest their judgments be unjust. It was forbidden to priests on duty, though the priests were given "the finest new wine" from the first fruits offerings for drinking outside the tabernacle and temple.

The Nazirites excluded as part of their ascetic regimen not only wine, but also vinegar, grapes, and raisins, though when Nazirites completed the term of their vow they were required to present wine as part of their sacrificial offerings and could drink of it. While John the Baptist adopted such a regimen, Jesus did not during his three years of ministry.

The Rechabites, a sub-tribe of the Kenites, vowed never to drink wine, live in houses, or plant fields or vineyards, not because of any "threat to wise living" from the latter [Prov. 20:1] practices, but because of their commitment to a nomadic lifestyle by not being bound to any particular piece of land. The Rechabites's strict obedience to the command of their father "not to drink wine" [Jer. 35:14] is commended and is contrasted with the failure of Jerusalem and the Kingdom of Judah to listen to their God.

During the Babylonian captivity, Daniel and his fellow Jews abstained from the meat and wine given to them by the king because they saw it as defiling in some way, though precisely how these would have defiled the Jews is not apparent in the text. A later passage implies that Daniel did drink wine at times, though it may not have been the king's. Similarly, Judith refused the Assyrian general's wine, though she drank wine from the stores she brought with her.

Christians are instructed regarding abstinence and their duty toward immature Christians: "All food is clean, but it is wrong for a man to eat anything that causes someone else to stumble. It is better not to eat meat or drink wine or to do anything else that will cause your brother to fall."

Symbolism and metaphor 
The commonness and centrality of wine in daily life in biblical times is apparent from its many positive and negative metaphorical uses throughout the Bible. Positively, free wine is used as a symbol of divine grace, and wine is repeatedly compared to intimate love in the Song of Solomon. Negatively, wine is personified as a mocker ("[t]he most hardened apostate" in the Book of Proverbs whose chief sin is pride) and beer a brawler (one who is "mocking, noisy, and restless").

Additionally, the chosen people and kingdom of God are compared to a divinely owned vine or vineyard in several places, and the image of new wine being kept in new wineskins, a process that would burst old wineskins, represents that the new faith Jesus was bringing "cannot be contained within the framework of the old." The complacent are compared with "wine left on its dregs" too long, such that it lacks a good taste and is of no value, and those who are corrupt are compared with excellent wine which has been diluted with water.

Wine was also used as a symbol of blessing and judgement throughout the Bible. Melchizedek blessed and refreshed Abraham's army with bread and wine; Isaac blessed Jacob by saying, "May God give you of heaven's dew and of earth's richness – an abundance of grain and new wine"; and when Jacob blessed his sons, he used a great abundance of wine as a symbol of Judah's prosperity. The nation of Israel was promised abundant wine and other central crops such as grain and oil if they kept God's covenant commandments, and their wine would be taken away as a curse if the Israelites failed to keep the covenant.

Drinking a cup of strong wine to the dregs and getting drunk are sometimes presented as a symbol of God's judgement and wrath, and Jesus alludes this cup of wrath, which he several times says he himself will drink. Similarly, the winepress is pictured as a tool of judgement where the resulting wine symbolizes the blood of the wicked who were crushed. Connected also to the cup of judgement is the wine of immorality, which the evil drink and which both brings and is part of the wrath of God.

The Day of the Lord, which is often understood by Christians to usher in the Messianic Age, is depicted as a time when "[n]ew wine will drip from the mountains and flow from all the hills," when God's people will "plant vineyards and drink their wine," and when God himself "will prepare a feast of rich food for all peoples, a banquet of aged wine – the best of meats and the finest of wines."

In the New Testament, Jesus uses wine at the Last Supper to signify the "New Covenant in [Jesus'] blood," but Christians differ over precisely how symbolic the wine is in the continuing ritual of the Eucharist.

Medicinal uses
Wine was used in ancient times for various medicinal ends, and the Bible refers to some of these practices. It was likely used as an anesthetic to dull pain, and many interpreters suggest that it was in this capacity that wines were offered to Jesus at his crucifixion.

In the Parable of the Good Samaritan, Jesus tells a story about a man from Samaria who assists an injured man by, among other things, pouring oil and wine on his wounds. Oil mixed with wine was a common remedy in the ancient world to cleanse wounds and assuage their pain.

Paul advises Timothy that he should not drink water only, but should use a little wine for the sake of his stomach and frequent infirmities. Some have suggested this advice is particularly in reference to purifying low quality drinking water, while others suggest it was simply intended to help his digestion and general sickliness. Abstentionists generally regard this passage as a positive example of abstention from wine and see Paul's instructions as exceptional and purely for the sake of health, while other interpreters suggest that Timothy was "upright in his aims" but here guilty of an "excess of severity" or that he felt inappropriately bound by a Hellenistic custom that younger men should not drink.

Reading the Bible as having no positive references to alcohol
There are some who interpret certain passages in the Bible as not referring to alcohol, arguing that all positive references to "wine" in Scripture refer to non-alcoholic beverages and all negative references speak of alcoholic beverages.  Advocates of this view, called the "two-wine" position, argue that the Greek and Hebrew words rendered "wine" in most English versions are generic terms for fruit juices; context determines if the beverage in view is alcoholic or not.  The fact is pointed out that even in earlier stages of the English language, such as in 1611 when the King James Version was translated, "wine" could refer to non-alcoholic beverages as well as alcoholic ones. The two-wine view is widespread in conservative Evangelicalism. Dr. Robert Teachout, a fundamental Baptist seminary professor, argued for this position in his 1979 doctoral dissertation The Use of "Wine" in the Old Testament. Separatist Baptist support for a biblical total abstinence position is widespread. Other sources for this view include the Purified Translation of the Bible, where extensive footnotes are used to promote the idea, and the 19th century Temperance Bible Commentary.

Footnotes

Works cited

 
 
 
 Ross, Thomas D., "And be not drunk with wine, but be filled with the Spirit," in The Doctrine of Sanctification, Ph. D. Dissertation, Great Plains Baptist Divinity School, 2014
 Teachout, Robert P., The Use of "Wine" In the Old Testament. Th. D. Dissertation, Dallas Theological Seminary, May 1979
 
 
 
 
 
 
 
 
 
 
 
 
 
 
 
 
 
 
 
 
 
 
 
 
 
 
 
 
 
 
 

Biblical topics
Oenology
Judaism and alcohol
Christianity and alcohol